Aquabacterium limnoticum is a Gram-negative, facultatively anaerobic, short-rod-shaped, non-spore-forming and non-motile bacterium of the genus Aquabacterium which has been isolated from a freshwater spring in Taiwan.

References

External links
Type strain of Aquabacterium limnoticum at BacDive -  the Bacterial Diversity Metadatabase	

Comamonadaceae
Bacteria described in 2012